Giorgos Lianis (born in Amyntaio, 2 September 1942) is a Greek journalist and politician.

Biography 
He was born on 2 September 1942 in Amyntaio, Florina. He is a first cousin of Dimitra Liani and nephew of the professor and minister Georgios Lianis and lieutenant general Konstantinos Lianis. He stueid in the Department of Chemistry of the Aristotle University of Thessaloniki. In his younger years he was a football player for G.S. Iraklis in the Super League.

He was a main witness in the trial of the perpetrators of the junta submitting important documents and recorded talks he had acquired, with evidence against Georgios Papadopoulos, Ioannis Ladas and Dimitrios Ioannidis.

He was elected member of parliament of Florina with PASOK in June 1989 and reelected in November 1989, 1990, 1993, 1996, 2000, 2004, 2007 and 2009. He served as Deputy Minister of Sport in the Ministry of Culture during 1993 – 1996 and 2002 – 2004.

On 14 June 2011 he left the parliamentary group of PASOK, refusing to vote the medium-term consolidation program for the Greek economy.

References

Sources 
 Giorgos Lianis' biography in Eleutherotypia

External links 
 Giorgos Lianis, biography and personal articles on Aixmi.gr

Greek writers
Greek journalists
1942 births
Living people
People from Amyntaio
Greek MPs 1989 (June–November)
Greek MPs 1989–1990
Greek MPs 1990–1993
Greek MPs 1993–1996
Greek MPs 1996–2000
Greek MPs 2000–2004
Greek MPs 2004–2007
Greek MPs 2007–2009
Greek MPs 2009–2012